Philip J. Whyte was a Scottish professional football outside right who played in the Scottish League for Heart of Midlothian.

Personal life 
Whyte served as a private in the Gloucestershire Regiment during the First World War.

Career statistics

References 

Scottish footballers
Scottish Football League players
British Army personnel of World War I
Heart of Midlothian F.C. players
Year of death missing
Year of birth missing
Place of birth missing
Association football outside forwards
Gloucestershire Regiment soldiers